George Gregory (1873 – after 1893) was an English professional footballer who played as a full-back.

References

1873 births
People from Hyde, Greater Manchester
English footballers
Association football fullbacks
Grimsby Town F.C. players
English Football League players
Year of death missing